Reigarvius Jacquez "Jarvis" Williams (born January 21, 1993) is an American professional basketball player who last played for Rytas Vilnius of the Lithuanian Basketball League.

Professional career
On August 7, 2019, Williams signed a one-year contract with ZZ Leiden of the Dutch Basketball League (DBL).

Exactly one year later, on August 7, 2020, Williams signed a one-year contract in Italy for Vanoli Cremona. He averaged 12.4 points, 8.3 rebounds and 1 steal per game. 

On July 23, 2021, Williams signed with Rytas Vilnius of the Lithuanian Basketball League (LKL) and the Champions League. On March 8, 2023, he parted ways with the team.

References

External links
Murray State Racers bio
RealGM profile

1995 births
Living people
American expatriate basketball people in France
American expatriate basketball people in Italy
American expatriate basketball people in Lithuania
American expatriate basketball people in the Netherlands
American expatriate basketball people in Poland
American expatriate basketball people in Turkey
American men's basketball players
BC Rytas players
Boulazac Basket Dordogne players
Caen Basket Calvados players
Centers (basketball)
Gordon State College alumni
Junior college men's basketball players in the United States
Lega Basket Serie A players
Murray State Racers men's basketball players
People from Kokomo, Indiana
Power forwards (basketball)
Rosa Radom players
Śląsk Wrocław basketball players
Tofaş S.K. players
Vanoli Cremona players